Nitrous oxide is a colorless, non-flammable gas, commonly known as laughing gas.

Nitrous oxide may also refer to:
 Nitrous oxide (medication)
 Nitrous oxide fuel blend, a class of liquid rocket propellants
 N2O: Nitrous Oxide, a video game

See also
 Nitros Oxide, character in Crash Bandicoot
 Nitrous oxide engine, an internal combustion engine